Paraembolides is a genus of Australian funnel-web spiders that was first described by Robert John Raven in 1980.

Species
 it contains eight species:
Paraembolides boycei (Raven, 1978) (type) – Australia (Queensland)
Paraembolides boydi (Raven, 1978) – Australia (New South Wales)
Paraembolides brindabella (Raven, 1978) – Australia (New South Wales, Australian Capital Territory)
Paraembolides cannoni (Raven, 1978) – Australia (Queensland)
Paraembolides grayi (Raven, 1978) – Australia (New South Wales)
Paraembolides montisbossi (Raven, 1978) – Australia (New South Wales)
Paraembolides tubrabucca (Raven, 1978) – Australia (New South Wales)
Paraembolides variabilis (Raven, 1978) – Australia (New South Wales)

References

Hexathelidae
Mygalomorphae genera
Spiders of Australia